2 Tay Street is an historic building in Perth, Scotland. It is Category C listed, dating to around 1875, and stands on Tay Street, near its junction with Bridge Lane, Charlotte Street and West Bridge Street, at the foot of Perth Bridge.

The three-storey building is described by Historic Environment Scotland as being constructed of "stugged red ashlar". Its central section is recessed slightly compared to its northern and southern sections, with a single window above the door.

See also 

 List of listed buildings in Perth, Scotland

References

External links 

 The building in 2021 – Google Street View

Tay Street, 26

1875 establishments in Scotland
Category C listed buildings in Perth and Kinross